John Leonard Carr (26 December 1913 – 11 July 1997) was an Australian rules footballer who played with Melbourne in the Victorian Football League (VFL).

Notes

External links 

1913 births
Australian rules footballers from Victoria (Australia)
Melbourne Football Club players
1997 deaths